Kribul Hill (‘Kribulski Halm’ \'kri-bul-ski 'h&lm\) is the rocky hill rising to 501 m on the southeast side of Cugnot Ice Piedmont on Trinity Peninsula in Graham Land, Antarctica.

The hill is named after the settlement of Kribul in Southwestern Bulgaria.

Location
German-British mapping in 1996.

Maps
 Trinity Peninsula. Scale 1:250000 topographic map No. 5697. Institut für Angewandte Geodäsie and British Antarctic Survey, 1996.
 Antarctic Digital Database (ADD). Scale 1:250000 topographic map of Antarctica. Scientific Committee on Antarctic Research (SCAR). Since 1993, regularly updated.

Notes

References
 Kribul Hill. SCAR Composite Antarctic Gazetteer
 Australian Antarctic Data Centre.
 Bulgarian Antarctic Gazetteer. Antarctic Place-names Commission. (details in Bulgarian, basic data in English)

External links
 Kribul Hill. Copernix satellite image

Hills of Trinity Peninsula
Bulgaria and the Antarctic